Sir Richard John Hayes  (born ) is a New Zealand helicopter pilot. With over 30,000 flying hours, he is among New Zealand's most experienced pilots. He is the CEO of Southern Lakes Helicopters, a helicopter transport provider based in Fiordland.

Hayes grew up in the South Otago town of Milton, but has spent much of his adult life in Te Anau, at the edge of Fiordland National Park. His brother, Juno Hayes, has been prominent in local politics, and was mayor of Clutha District Council for 12 years, receiving an ONZM in the 2014 Queen's Birthday Honours  — the same list in which Richard was knighted. Richard's nickname, "Hannibal", comes from the name of a character in 1970s television series Alias Smith and Jones.

Although primarily a helicopter tour guide, Hayes is known for his search-and-rescue feats. He has participated in numerous emergency flights, including searching for survivors during the sinking of Kotuku in the Foveaux Strait and assisting with the 2013 search of a crashed plane on the slopes of Mount Elizabeth in Antarctica.
In 2007 he received the Federation Aeronautique Internationale Diploma for Outstanding Airmanship.
In 2008, he famously saved his company's flagship helicopter, averting a disastrous crash by landing it "like a fixed-wing aircraft" at 80 knots of ground speed.

In the 2001 New Year Honours, Hayes was appointed a Member of the New Zealand Order of Merit, for services to search and rescue operations. In the 2014 Queen's Birthday Honours, he was promoted to Knight Companion of the New Zealand Order of Merit, for services to Search and Rescue and the community.

In 2019 Hayes led a rescue effort to find the survivors of a helicopter that crashed into the ocean near the Auckland Islands. The three passengers all survived the crash, and were found one day later with only minor injuries.

References

Deer Recovery Origins: Sir Tim Wallis and his Alpine Helicopters, Fiordland New Zealand
Wild Coasts with Craig Potton - Fiordland & Faraway Coasts
'Fly Guy': North South Article

External links
Southern Lakes Helicopters biography

1950s births
Living people
Helicopter pilots
New Zealand aviators
Knights Companion of the New Zealand Order of Merit
Year of birth missing (living people)
People from Milton, New Zealand
People from Te Anau